The 1969 FIVB Men's World Cup was held from 13 to 20 September 1969 in East Germany.

Qualification

* North Korea were replaced by Bulgaria.

Results

First round

Pool A
Location: East Berlin

|}

|}

Pool B
Location: Leipzig

|}

|}

Pool C
Location: Halle

|}

|}

Final round
The results and the points of the matches between the same teams that were already played during the first round are taken into account for the final round.

7th–11th places
Location: Halle and Schwerin

|}

|}

Final places
Location: Halle and Schwerin

|}

|}

Final standing

1 East Germany Junior men's national team played friendly games in the place of North Korea.

External links
 Men Volleyball II World Cup 1969 - Halle/Schwerin (GDR) 13-20.09 Winner East Germany (1st) todor66.com
 

FIVB Volleyball Men's World Cup
Men's World Cup
1969 in East German sport
International sports competitions hosted by East Germany
International volleyball competitions hosted by Germany